Joshua Solomon Jeremiah Jordan (born January 9, 1987), better known by his stage name, Never Yet Contested, is an American rapper, artist, songwriter, and record producer. He was born and raised in Brooklyn, New York.

Early life
Never Yet Contested was born Joshua Solomon Jeremiah Jordan, in New York. He is of Guyanese and Grenadian descent. Never Yet Contested grew up in New York City and attended Brooklyn Technical High School. He received an undergraduate degree from Pennsylvania State University.

Career beginnings
Never Yet Contested became an emcee after going through trying times in college. It was noted that he needed a more constructive way of venting his many experiences. Channeling his thoughts allowed him to excel at putting together a diverse array of lyrical content.

Never Yet Contested has weathered the storms that come with being an aspiring artist in the hip-hop world, appearing on tracks with such underground artists as R-Son & Ad Liberal (The Flight Brothers), J.J. Brown (5G Productions), and  Louis Logic, in an effort to evolve his own style working off of the diverse collaborative efforts he undertakes. Never Yet Contested's first offering to hip-hop was his own, independently released Showmanship mix-tape.

Career

Taking inspiration from artists such as Busta Rhymes, Mos Def, Talib Kweli, Common, The Roots, Black Thought, Pharoahe Monch, Rakim, Nas, The Notorious B.I.G., Red Hot Chili Peppers, Coldplay, Snoop Dogg, Dr. Dre, A Tribe Called Quest, Never Yet Contested has developed a music style that blends multiple genres.

...In Retrospect
Never Yet Contested debuted in 2008 with the album ...In Retrospect and has maintained an underground following. This album showcases a conceptual hip-hop journey that reinvigorated the spirit of hip-hop, in a style that weaves back and forth between contemporary and authentic. From start to finish, ...In Retrospect is an assault of tracks that deliberately addresses a slew of issues, ranging from a lost focus plaguing the hip-hop artists of today ("I Can’t Take It"), to the mind numbing effects of television ("Boob Tube"), while even touching on the guilt of his own overindulgence ("Intoxication").

Never Yet Contested's video for "I Can’t Take It/True Statement", featuring Baldi and Suburban Graffiti, won the mtvU's "The Freshmen" video contest in April 2009, earning his video rotation on MTV.

Retro EP
Never Yet Contested collaborated with Tru Statement Entertainment to release his first EP, Retro EP on Black Friday, November 26, 2010. The lead single, "Retro", was scheduled to be released in conjunction with Nintendo celebrating the 25th anniversary of Super Mario Bros., based on the video game content of the song. Super Mario Bros. was released in Japan in 1985 on the Famicom, the Japanese version of the Nintendo Entertainment System. Since then, Mario has become one of the most iconic characters and entertainment brands in the world. The concept behind the Retro EP is "old school" themes (video games, relationships, instrumentation). The EP also features the first songs ever recorded by Never Yet Contested and producers/engineers J.J. Brown and Dan Maier of 5G Productions.

The "Retro" video was profiled by Wired magazine, where it received acclaimed praise for being a brand-new video single with a distinctly old-school twist. "Retro" celebrates not only classic systems like the NES, but the evolution of the home video game console.

MC TXT
MC TXT ("emcee tee ex tee") is an interactive mobile application used in progressive hip-hop performance and entertainment. The audience members direct the venue by text messaging phrases, comments, and shout-outs to the mobile phone number provided on a main projector, where all messages are showcased. Audience members then watch as their messages are displayed amid unique visual backgrounds within minutes. The various emcees associated with MC TXT include Homeboy Sandman, Illspokinn, Folklore, Baldi, and Never Yet Contested. The emcees then freestyle the messages, creating a string of punchlines, stories, and name drops for the audience.

The Melting Pot

With his release The Melting Pot, Never Yet Contested has rewritten the formula for how to drop an album in this hectic and ever-changing world of music. The album was produced to create a cohesive blend of all musical genres that utilize elements of hip-hop, such as dance music, mainstream, underground and alternative. Instead of merely showcasing his talents in one area of hip-hop, he wanted to produce a body of work that could please the ears of music fans stemming from all backgrounds and musical tastes. He created an album where one could expect the unexpected and where you could present a diverse approach to hip-hop and to producing music in general.

To further expand upon his unique approach with The Melting Pot, the album's release was different from most. As opposed to simply providing a full LP for listeners to purchase, Never Yet Contested enabled listeners to purchase the album either as a whole or as four smaller, genre-specific EPs. By doing so he created a brand-new element for the music fan, the element of choice. With dozens of featured artists, and four different genres of music and sub-genres of hip-hop, the concept is all about changing the landscape of music.

Formative Feedback
In 2017, Never Yet Contested partnered with veteran DJ and Producer, Morsy to create a multi-cultural and international album which encapsulated their experience traveling all across the globe. The project's global appeal is assisted by its range of global influences, which include Brazil's Bossa Nova style on the Raphaello Mazzei collaboration, “Nao A Solidao”. Unlike other projects by Never Yet Contested, the tone of Formative Feedback blends electronica to deep house with tracks like “Crystals” (featuring and co-produced by MopTop and Codes) bringing unique vibes which demonstrates the diversity of this eclectic project. Collaborations like this also enabled Morsy the ability to work with legendary labels, such as Strictly Rhythm, Nervous Records, Jango Music and Good For You Records and performing at Coachella.

Discography
Albums, EPs and Mixtapes

 Showmanship (2006)
 ... In Retrospect (2008)
 Retro EP (2010)
 The Melting Pot (2012)
 Formative Feedback (2017)

Collaborations and guest appearances (list is not exhaustive)

 Under the Weather: The NJLP (2006) (Baldi and Suburban Graffiti)
 The Planet (2010) (Par 3 Productions)
 F?@k Love (2010) (Tru Statement Entertainment)
 No Slices (2010) (Ayinde)
 More EP (2010) (M.A.E. Indigo and Express The Motif)
 Plus 30 (2010) (Free Trade)
 F?@k Love Volume 2 (2011) (Tru Statement Entertainment)

External links
 Official website
 https://itunes.apple.com/WebObjects/MZStore.woa/wa/viewArtist?id=279599896
 http://www.mtv.com/music/artist/never_yet_contested/artist.jhtml
 http://www.mtvu.com/music/the-freshmen/never-yet-contested-i-cant-take-it/

1987 births
Living people
Rappers from Brooklyn
American people of Grenadian descent
American people of Guyanese descent
21st-century American rappers